The New Jersey Storm were a member of the National Lacrosse League, based in East Rutherford, New Jersey. They played from 2002 to 2003 playing at the then Continental Airlines Arena. The team was an expansion team that was purchased for by an equity investment ownership group led former NBA All-Star Jayson Williams and Hiza Gay. After the 2003 NLL season the team was sold and relocated to Anaheim, California, becoming the Anaheim Storm under a new ownership group led by Kent Recal.
 
The NLL returned to the New York Metro area in 2007 with the inaugural season of the New York Titans, who would play at Madison Square Garden and Nassau Coliseum. The Titans would play for three seasons before relocating to Orlando, Florida.

All time Record

Defunct National Lacrosse League teams
Lacrosse clubs established in 2002
Lacrosse clubs disestablished in 2003
Lacrosse teams in New Jersey
Sports in East Rutherford, New Jersey
2002 establishments in New Jersey
2003 disestablishments in New Jersey